The 'St. Stanislaus Kostka Mission is a historic Roman Catholic church in Rathdrum, Idaho. It serves as a mission and chapel of ease of the Parish of St. George in Post Falls, both within the Roman Catholic Diocese of Boise.

The church was established by Fr. T.J. Purcell, who as a young coal miner in Pennsylvania had aspired to the priesthood, but been unable to pursue it due to epilepsy. He prayed to St. Stanislaus Kostka of Poland, who also faced obstacles in his path to a religious vocation, promising to build and dedicate a church to the saint if he were cured. He relocated to Spokane, where he met a bishop who invited him to study for the priesthood in Montreal. Purcell built the Rathdrum church to fulfill his vow. A mural of St. Stanislaus kneeling before the Virgin Mary and infant Jesus was donated by Gonzaga University and restored in 2014.

Designed in the Gothic Revival architectural style, the church was built in 1900 and dedicated in 1901. It is the oldest Roman Catholic church built with bricks in the state of Idaho. It has been listed on the National Register of Historic Places since November 17, 1977.

References

External links

National Register of Historic Places in Kootenai County, Idaho
Churches in the Roman Catholic Diocese of Boise
Gothic Revival architecture in Idaho
Roman Catholic churches completed in 1900
Christian organizations established in 1901
Churches on the National Register of Historic Places in Idaho
20th-century Roman Catholic church buildings in the United States